The knockout stage for the 2022 Thomas Cup in Bangkok, Thailand, will begin on 12 May 2022 with the quarter-finals and will end on 15 May with the final tie.

Qualified teams
The top two placed teams from each of the eight groups will qualify for this stage.

Bracket
The draw was conducted on 11 May 2022, after the last match of the group stage.

Quarter-finals

Indonesia vs China

Chinese Taipei vs Japan

India vs Malaysia

South Korea vs Denmark

Semi-finals

Indonesia vs Japan

India vs Denmark

Final

Indonesia vs India

References

Thomas knockout stage